Collegiate School (formerly known as Colston's Collegiate School and Colston’s School) is a private day school in Bristol, England, and is a member of the Headmasters' and Headmistresses' Conference. It is currently in a period of transition from the name Colston’s to Collegiate after BLM protests in 2020.

It was founded in 1710 by the merchant, Member of Parliament, philanthropist and slave trader Edward Colston as Colston's Hospital, originally an all-boys boarding school. Day-boys were admitted in 1949 and girls were admitted to the sixth form in 1984. In 1991 it merged with the Collegiate School, a girls' school in Winterbourne, and was given the name Colston's Collegiate School, but this was reverted to Colston's School in 2005. The current headmaster of the upper school is Jeremy McCullough (since September 2014); he joined the school from Lancing College.

Motto
The school motto Go and do thou likewise, was the motto for the Colston family. It is also one of the mottos for Colston's Girls' School.  Its origin is Luke 10:37, the conclusion of the parable of the Good Samaritan.

Beginnings

Colston made a donation to Queen Elizabeth's Hospital in 1702 and proposed endowing places for a further 50 boys. This came to nothing, probably because of Colston's insistence that the children of Dissenters should be excluded. Instead, he persuaded the Society of Merchant Venturers to manage a school he established for 50 boys on Saint Augustine's Back, where the Colston Hall now stands. It cost him £11,000 on capital cost and an endowment income of over £1,300. The boys (soon increased to 100) were admitted between the ages of seven and ten years and stayed for seven years. The curriculum covered reading, writing and arithmetic, and the church catechism. On leaving they were to be apprenticed to a trade. Colston was opposed to Dissent and proposed that any boy who attended a service of worship in any place other than an Anglican church should be expelled. He also told the Merchant Venturers that if they apprenticed a boy to a Dissenter they would be in breach of their Trust.

In 1794 its master was James Gadd, of Temple Street. The school moved in 1861 to the old Bishops' Palace at Stapleton, which is a grade II listed building, and ceased to be a charity institution with a limited curriculum. It also accepted fee-paying boys as well as the 100 boys on the charity foundation. By 1955 the school had 35 foundation scholars, selected by open competition, among its 200 boarders and 100 day boys.

Name
In April 2022, the school announced that, from September, it will be known as Collegiate School, Bristol.  The change followed consultations over the desire to drop the reference to Edward Colston, a notorious slave trader, in its name.  The school merged with the Collegiate School in Winterbourne in 1991.

Houses
Before the advent of the day-boys there were four boarding houses, North, South, East and West. These were renamed Aldington, Mortlake, Roundway and Beaufort, with Dolphin being the day-boys house. Later, King's was added as an additional day-boys house. Now there are four day houses, one of which each pupil is allocated at the start of their Colston's career. The school's boarding house Mortlake was closed in 2010 when Colston's School ended a long tradition as a boarding institution.

The House Cup is contested by the four day houses using a points system over the course of each academic year. The house with the greatest number of points at the end of that academic year will be awarded the Cup. Points are gained by either the collection of commendations, awarded by teachers for outstanding pieces of work, or through performance in house competitions. Points are deducted for receiving detentions. Sports competitions are played on a round robin basis and divided into three school blocks; Years 7 and 8, Years 9 and 10 and Year 11 and 6th Form. Sports competitions include:

 Rugby (boys and girls)
 Hockey (boys and girls)
 Cricket (boys and girls)
 Netball (girls only)
 Rugby sevens 
 Cross Country (boys and girls)
 Athletics (boys and girls)

The biggest house competition in the school calendar is the House Music. Any individual or group of pupils may enter the preliminary round, displaying any kind of musical performance, and all are awarded points for entering. The best performers will advance to the semi-finals, where they perform in front of their entire year, and the winners from this round will advance to the final where they perform in front of the whole school on the final day of the spring term. In addition to this, each of the four houses pick a song a few weeks in advance of the final to rehearse and perform as a house. An independent adjudicator is brought in by the school to judge the four house songs and select a winner of the House Song, and to determine the overall winner of the House Music, which is between the four day houses. Victories in either of these competitions have a significant impact on the destination of the House Cup for that year.

Facilities

Colston’s sporting legacy is supported by a wide range of facilities, dispersed over 30 acres of landscaped grounds - on site; unique to central Bristol schools. The vast open spaces include areas of woodland, which make it an ideal venue for Colston's Pre-Preparatory, Early Years and Lower school to explore and create a challenging cross country circuit. The site includes an athletics field with pavilion, 6 rugby pitches, 2 cricket squares, a floodlit all-weather hockey pitch, 6 floodlit tennis courts/ 4 floodlit netball courts, a fully equipped fitness suite, 4 squash courts, table tennis facilities, a sports hall with 4 badminton courts/ basketball court, indoor cricket nets and an axe throwing range.

Uniform

Colston modelled his school on Christ's Hospital and the 18th-century uniform reflected this – a long blue coat, knee britches and yellow stockings. By the middle of the 20th century this was mirrored by the yellow tops of the knee stockings worn by all boys until they graduated to long trousers at the age of 13. At that time caps were worn whenever a boy left the premises of the school. They were the typical peaked cap with a coloured band around the rim and an embroidered dolphin at the front, the colour reflecting the house the boy belonged to – Dolphin's was maroon, for example.

Activities

Drama
It is the only school in Bristol that can offer all 14 GCSE theatre options. There are a number of shows throughout the year across the age range, including GCSE A-Level and Drama Club productions. In May 2010 Year 9 students devised and produced their own version of Cinderella which raised just short of £1000 for the charity Barnardo's.

Cadet Force
The school's Combined Cadet Force (CCF) of 256 cadets, the largest since its formation in 1915, and the biggest in Bristol. The CCF has Army, Royal Air Force and Royal Navy sections and is compulsory for Year 9 and Cadets above Year 9 are trained in teaching all sections of the CCF syllabus to aid with the 3 Permanent CCF Staff. The CCF normally parades every week and carries out activities, including rifle shooting on the school's 15m pipe range, command tasks, climbing, camouflage and concealment, flying, sailing and walking with regular camps. The Royal Navy section has access to sailing boats which are owned by The Royal Navy these include Laser Picos, Toppers and an RS200 racing boat.

Rugby
The school plays rugby union. It won the NatWest Schools Cup (previously the Daily Mail Cup) at U18 level seven times, including six years in a row between 1995 and 2000.
In 1999 there was a change in regulations which restricted the number of newcomers into a Sixth Form who could play in the competition. The school went on to win the competition on a further two occasions in 2000 and 2004 under these new regulations before withdrawing to seek bigger challenges

Over 50 old boys have played in the top tier of professional rugby with 11 players representing their countries during the professional era

Location

Colston's is located at the top of Bell Hill, a road running close to the M32 motorway.

Notable former pupils

Former students, known as Old Colstonians, include:
 Callum Braley, rugby union footballer and current Benetton rugby union footballer, International player for Italy 
 Jake Polledri, rugby union footballer and current Gloucester rugby union footballer, International player for Italy
 Olly Barkley, rugby union footballer and current London Welsh player.
 Thomas Chatterton, romantic poet and child prodigy, who died aged 17
 Jordan Crane, rugby union footballer and current Bristol player
 John Ebling, Marine Biologist and Professor of Zoology
 Shane Geraghty, rugby union footballer and current Bristol player
 Andrew Ibrahim, convicted terrorist known as 'The Boarding School Bomber'
 Peter Mathias, former Master of Downing College, Cambridge
 Lee Mears, rugby union footballer
 Alan Morley MBE, holder of world record for tries scored in first class rugby union and current board member at the Bristol Bears
 Jack Spoors, British Isles international rugby player
 Robert Syms, Conservative MP for Poole, Dorset
 Chris Taylor, Gloucester county cricketer, current England fielding coach
 Tom Varndell, rugby union footballer and current Bristol player.
 Robert Walter, former Conservative MP for North Dorset
 Amber Reed, English rugby union footballer
 Bryan Webber, theoretical physicist; co-winner (2012) of the J.J. Sakurai Prize for Theoretical Particle Physics

References

Further reading
Roger Wilson, Chapter 22, "Bristol's School", in Bristol and its Adjoining Counties, 1955

External links
 
Profile on the Independent Schools Council website

Educational institutions established in 1710
1710 establishments in England
Member schools of the Headmasters' and Headmistresses' Conference
Grade II listed buildings in Bristol
Private schools in Bristol
Charities based in Bristol
Grade II listed educational buildings